Jason Nathan Bli (born 2 November 1993, in Clichy-la-Garenne) is a French footballer who plays as a left back.

Career

Club
Bli started his career with French Division 3 club Paris FC, where he played for the club's reserve team. He moved to CFA club L'Entente SSG during their 2013-14 season.

Bli signed with USL Pro club LA Galaxy II on August 20, 2014.

In late August 2015, Bli signed a permanent deal with Lyn Fotball in the third tier in Norway. He made his debut against Harstad IL August 23 of that year.

References

External links

1993 births
Living people
Association football defenders
French footballers
French expatriate footballers
Paris FC players
LA Galaxy II players
Lyn Fotball players
Hønefoss BK players
USL Championship players
Norwegian Second Division players
Norwegian Third Division players
Expatriate soccer players in the United States
French expatriate sportspeople in the United States
Expatriate footballers in Norway
French expatriate sportspeople in Norway